Persian verbs are very regular compared with those of most European languages. From the two stems given in dictionaries (e.g. ,  'take, took',  'write, wrote',  'give, gave' etc.) it is possible to derive all the other forms of almost any verb. The main irregularity is that given one stem it is not usually possible to predict the other. Another irregularity is that the verb 'to be' has no stem in the present tense.

Persian verbs are inflected for three singular and three plural persons. The 2nd and 3rd person plural are often used when referring to singular persons for politeness.

There are fewer tenses in Persian than in English. There are about ten tenses in all. The greatest variety is shown in tenses referring to past events. A series of past tenses (past simple, imperfect, and pluperfect) is matched by a corresponding series of perfect tenses (perfect simple, perfect continuous, and perfect pluperfect — the last of these made by adding a perfect ending to the pluperfect tense). These perfect tenses are used sometimes much as the English perfect tense (e.g. 'I have done' etc.), but often in an inferential or reportative sense ('apparently I had done' etc.), similar to the perfect tense in Turkish.

The present tense has a range of meanings (habitual, progressive, punctual, historic). In colloquial Persian this tense is also used with future meaning, although there also exists a separate future tense used in formal styles. In colloquial Persian there are also three progressive tenses (present, past, and perfect).

There are two subjunctive mood forms, present and perfect. Subjunctive verbs are often used where English uses an infinitive, e.g. 'I want to go' is expressed in Persian as 'I want I may go'.

A perfect participle is made by adding -e to the second stem. This participle is active in intransitive verbs, e.g.  'gone', but passive in transitive verbs, e.g.  'written (by someone)'. As well as being used to make the perfect tenses, this perfect participle can be used to make the passive of transitive verbs, by adding different parts of the verb  'to become'.

Compound verbs, such as  'to open' (lit. 'to make open') and  'to learn', are very frequently used in modern Persian.

In colloquial Persian, commonly used verbs tend to be pronounced in an abbreviated form, for example  'he is' is pronounced e,  'he goes' is pronounced mire, and  'I say' is pronounced migam. (Compare, eg, "gotcha" in English which is an abbreviated form of "have you got your...")

In Persian the verb usually comes at the end of the clause, although there are sometimes exceptions (for example in colloquial Persian it is common to hear phrases such as  'I went to Tehran' where the destination follows the verb).

Infinitives and stems
The principal parts of a verb are the infinitive stem and present stem. The infinitive stem (often called the past stem) is made simply by removing the ن (-an) from the infinitive:

  ('to make/to do') - 
  ('to have') - 
  ('to take') - 
  ('to see') - 
  ( 'to write') - 
  ( 'to go') - 
  ( 'to become') - 

The present stem tends to vary more, and in many common verbs bears little resemblance to the infinitive stem:

  - 
  - 
  - 
  - 
  - 
  -  ( or )
  -  ( or )

The present indicative, present subjunctive, and present participle are made from the present stem, other tenses from the infinitive stem. Both stems can be used to make verbal nouns such as  
 (or ) 'dialogue',   'going and coming',   'calligrapher'.

The infinitive itself differs in usage from the English infinitive; for example, the subjunctive not the infinitive is used in sentences such as 'I want to go' or 'I am able to go'. The Persian infinitive is more like a verbal noun or gerund, used in phrases such as   'the writing of this book' or   'the invention of writing'.

Note that in the transliteration used in this article, the letter 'x' represents a velar fricative sound, similar to the Peninsular Spanish 'j' as in 'jota', and 'š' and 'č' represent the sounds of English 'sh' and 'ch'.

Participles
Persian verbs have two participles - perfect and present.

The perfect participle is formed by adding ه -e to the infinitive stem. It is passive in transitive verbs but active in intransitive verbs (e.g. rafte 'gone').
  -  'done' or 'made'
  -  'taken'
  (to see) -  'seen'
  ( 'to write') -  'written'

As well as being used to make the perfect tenses, the perfect participle can be used as an adjective or noun:
  'the past month', i.e. 'last month'
  'his writings'

The present participle, which is less common, is formed by adding نده -ande to the present stem. Usually this is used as an agent noun (e.g.   'writer'), though sometimes it is a verbal adjective (e.g.   'the coming year', i.e. 'next year'). A true participle ending in -ān (e.g.   'smiling') also exists for some verbs.

Personal endings
Personal forms of verbs are formed mostly with simple suffixes. The personal suffixes for the present and future tense and the two subjunctive tenses are:
 ـم (-am): first person singular ("I") ( hastam)
 ـی (-i): second person singular ("you sg." (informal))
 ـد (-ad): third person singular; colloquially pronounced -e ("he, she, it")
 ـیم (-im): first person plural ("we")
 ـید (-id): second person plural; colloquially pronounced -in ("you" (plural or respectful))
 ـند (-and): third person plural; colloquially pronounced -an ("they"; "he/she" (respectful))

The 2nd and 3rd persons plural may refer to singular persons for added respect. One major exception is God, for whom plural forms are never used.

The past, imperfect, and pluperfect tenses have very similar endings, except that there is no ending in the 3rd person singular:
 ـم (-am): first person singular
 ـی (-i): second person singular
 - ( - ): third person singular
 ـیم (-im): first person plural
 ـید (-id): second person plural), colloquially pronounced  -in
 ـند (-and): third person plural, colloquially pronounced -an

These same endings are used for the verbs   'he is' and   'he isn't', despite their being present tenses.

There is no ending in the 3rd person singular, but often in informal speech, the suffix -eš (lit. 'his/her') is added to supply the gap, e.g.  'he said'.

The perfect tenses have the following personal endings:
 ـه‌ام (-e am'): first person singular
 ـه‌ای (-e i): second person singular informal
 ـه (-e): third person singular
 ـه‌ايم (-e im): first person plural
 ـه‌ايد (-e id): second person plural
 ـه‌اند (-e and): third person plural

Examples of various tenses are given below using the verb   'to do'. Note that personal pronouns are frequently dropped and are provided here for clarity.

Present tenses
General present
The present tense is formed by prefixing می mi- to the present stem with personal endings (for stems ending with vowels, a y- is added before the personal ending):

   'I do'
   'you do' - singular
   'he/she/it does'
   'we do'
   'you do' - plural or formal
   'they do'

The negative is made with the prefix  ne-, which is stressed:   'I don't do'.

In classical Persian the present tense is often found without the prefix mi-, but in modern Persian mi- is always added except in the verb  'to have', where it is usually omitted.

The present tense has various present meanings (general, habitual, progressive, performative); it can also have a future meaning (see below). Colloquially the present tense can also be used as a historical present when narrating events of the past, especially when relating events which occurred suddenly or unexpectedly.

Another meaning is the equivalent of an English perfect continuous in sentences such as: 'I have been waiting for you for an hour' (lit. 'it is one hour that I am expecting you')

Present tense of 'to be'

The present tense of the verb   'to be' is irregular in that it has no present stem. Instead it consists of enclitic words which cannot be used without a preceding noun or adjective. They are as follows:

   'I am'
   'you are'
   'he, she, it is' (colloquially pronounced e)
   'we are'
   'you are' (plural or formal)
   'they are' (or 'he/she is' - formal)

An example of the use of these is as follows:'I am your daughter; this is my brother; you (sg.) are my father.'

There is also a second form of the present tense of 'to be' used to add emphasis, express existence and to avoid vowel combinations such as i-i, which despite being a present tense, has the endings of a past tense as follows:
   'I am'
   'you are'
   'he/she/it is'
   'we are'
   'you are' (plural or formal)
   'they are' (or 'he/she is' - formal)

Yet another, but less commonly used, form of the verb 'to be' is  'I am', etc., which has the normal present tense endings.

Present progressive
The present tense can be reinforced in its progressive meaning by adding the present tense of   'to have' before the main verb. It is used in colloquial Persian only:

   'I am doing (at this moment)'
       
    The two halves of the verb are usually separated by other words, e.g.  'he is eating at the moment'. There is no negative.

Past tenses

Past simple
The past simple is formed with the infinitive stem and personal endings. There is no ending in the 3rd person singular:
   'I did'
          The stress in this tense goes on the syllable before the ending, e.g. ,  'I took'.

The negative is made with na- (stressed):  'I didn't do (it)'.

In addition to its normal meaning of the simple past (e.g. 'he went'), the past simple also has some idiomatic uses in Persian. For example, colloquially it can be used in 'if' and 'when' clauses referring to future time: 'when you reach London, phone us at once' 'by the time you come back I will have written the letter'

Another idiom is  'I'm coming (at once!)'

The past simple tense in Persian is also often used where English might use the perfect to refer to events which have just occurred: 'the plane has just this moment landed' 'talk of the devil! he's just come in the door!'

Imperfect
The imperfect is formed by prefixing می mi- to the simple past:

   'I was doing, used to do, would do, would have done'
          The negative has ne-:  'I was not doing'.

The imperfect of   'to be' and   'to have' do not use the prefix می mi-, except sometimes when the meaning is 'would be' or 'would have':
   'I was'
   'I had'

The negative of these is made with na-:  'I was not'.

As well as its main past habitual or past progressive meaning ('I used to go', 'I was going'), the imperfect in Persian is also used in a conditional meaning ('I would go', 'I would have gone'), for example: 'if I knew that, I would tell you' / 'if I had known that, I would have told you'

It can also be used in sentences expressing unfulfilled wishes concerning the present or the past: 'I would love to have gone' / 'I would have loved to go' / 'I would love to be going' 'I wish he were alive' 'I would love to have been in his place'

Past progressive
In colloquial Persian the progressive aspect of the imperfect tense can be reinforced in its progressive meaning by adding the past tense of   before it:

   'I was doing (at that moment)'
          When used in a sentence, the two parts of the verb are usually separated by other words, e.g. 
   'I was beginning to forget you'

There is no negative.

Pluperfect
The pluperfect is a compound tense formed from the perfect participle and the simple past of the verb  (to be). As well as its ordinary use as a pluperfect, like the imperfect it can also be used in a conditional sense:
   'I had done', 'I would have done'
          The negative is formed with na-:  'I hadn't done'.

The verb  'to be' is not used in the pluperfect tense, the simple past being used instead.

Sometimes a continuous version of the pluperfect is found but this is rare and not generally used; some Persian grammarians consider it ungrammatical.

As well as its ordinary pluperfect meaning ('he had gone'), the pluperfect can also be used instead of the imperfect in the sense 'would have gone' or 'if (only) he had gone':
   'if only I hadn't had an accident!'
   'if he hadn't come, that incident wouldn't have happened!'

Perfect tenses
Corresponding to each of the past tenses, Persian has a set of perfect tenses. These tenses are not only used in the ordinary perfect sense ('he has done X', 'he has sometimes done X') but also in colloquial Persian in an inferential or reported sense ('it appears that he did X'), Most other Iranian dialects of the region have a similar use of the perfect tense and it is likely that this is due to areal contact with Turkish, which is also spoken in Iran.

Perfect simple
The perfect simple is formed by adding the present-tense suffixes of the verb   ('to be') to the perfect participle:

   'I have done'
     (colloquially , with  omitted)
      The negative is made with na- (stressed):  'I have not done'.

The perfect tense is used in situations similar to those described for the perfect in English. One situation is the perfect of result: 'they have arrived (and are still here)' 'I've lost my pen'

Another is the experiential perfect, to describe an event that has happened before (and may happen again): 'I have visited America three times'

Another use of the perfect is to describe a situation that has lasted a long time up to now: 'we have always been envious of the west' 'he has lived here all his life'

Unlike the English perfect, the Persian perfect is compatible with a past-time adverbial.Simeonova & Zareikar. It is often used in sentences such as: 'this house was built in 1939' 'Manuchehr gave the book back to him yesterday'

Another use which differs from English is in sentences of the type 'it is a long time since X happened': 'it is just six months since he came from England'

With verbs meaning 'stand', 'sit', 'lie' the perfect can represent a present state: 'he is standing'

Perfect continuous
The perfect continuous is made by adding the prefix mi- to the perfect:
   'I have been doing'; 'I used to do'

The negative (which is rare) is made with ne-:  'I have not been doing'.

This tense is not used in the same way in Persian as the English perfect continuous. As noted above, the present, not the perfect is used in sentences of the kind 'I have been waiting for an hour' (lit. 'it is an hour that I am waiting for you').

However, it can be used in sentences such as the following referring to events which have been happening repeatedly or continuously for a long time: 'my past has always been following me'<ref>Bozorg Alavi, Čašmhā-yaš</ref>
 'he has lived in this city for years'

Another common use which differs from English is to express a situation that no longer exists, that is, it is the equivalent of 'I used to do':
 'I used to speak German, but now I have forgotten it'

It can also be used in an inferential sense, as in:
 'from his wet hair it was evident that he had been bathing'
 '(it was no doubt) because the children were playing that they didn't hear you call'

Perfect progressive
A progressive version of the perfect continuous is also found in colloquial Persian, but it seems only in the 3rd person:
   'apparently he was doing'

It is typically used in an inferential sense (that is, with the idea 'it would seem that...'), for example, in sentences in which the speaker is reporting something he has been told, but did not personally witness, such as the following:
 '(apparently) he was (caught) stealing a car, they gave him a proper beating; (it seems) he was five days in hospital.'

Perfect pluperfect
This is occasionally used in a non-inferential sense, but much more frequently it is inferential:
   'I have sometimes been in the position of having done'; 'it seems that I had done'

A typical example of its use is the following:
 'he told me that he was a communist ... (it would seem that) some time previously he had gone to Egypt for about three months'

Future tenses
The future tense is formed by adding a shortened version of the infinitive, identical with the infinitive stem, to the present tense form of the verb   'I want', but without the prefix mi-. It is rarely used in colloquial Persian, since the present tense is usually used with a future meaning instead (especially with verbs of motion):
   'I will do' 
  
  
  
  
  

The positive verb is stressed on the personal ending: . The negative is  'I will not do', with stress on ná-.

There is no distinction between simple and continuous in the future. There is also no future perfect. To represent the future perfect (e.g. 'I will have finished') Persian uses either the future simple or colloquially the perfect simple:
 'I shall have finished by Friday'
 'I shall have finished by Friday'

Another way of expressing future in colloquial Persian is to use a form meaning literally 'he wants to do it' in the sense 'he is about to do it', for example:
 'the plane is about to take off'
 'the plane was about to take off'

There are also other expressions used for referring to the future, such as  'it is arranged' or  'I'm intending to', followed by the subjunctive:
 'Ali is to come tomorrow'
 'I'm going to buy an apartment next year'

The present tense is also frequently used with future reference, but especially of verbs of motion or arriving. A time adverbial is also required to avoid ambiguity:
 'my brother is going to Shiraz tomorrow'

Subjunctive tenses

Present subjunctive
The present subjunctive is formed by prefixing بـ be- to the present stem with personal endings, e.g.  'I may write'. When the verb has the vowel o this changes to bo-:

   'that I do, I may do'
  
  
   
  
  

When used as part of a compound verb, the prefix be- is sometimes omitted, e.g.   'what am I to do?'

The negative also lacks the prefix be-:  'that I not do'.

The present subjunctive of the verb  'to have' is usually replaced by the perfect subjunctive  .

The present subjunctive is very common in Persian. It is used whenever it is uncertain whether an event will take place, or whether a situation is true, e.g. 
  'maybe I'll go'
  'it is possible that he will come'
  'if I go, I will run'
  'I hope you are well'

It is used for indefinite relative clauses such as the following:
  'is there anyone who knows Persian?'

The subjunctive is also used after phrases such as  'before...' (of future or past time),  'until...' (of future time only),  'so that':
  'before you go, sign this'

It is also used instead of an infinitive after verbs such as 'I want', 'I can', 'I must', 'it is possible that', and in indirect commands:
  'I must go'
  'he ordered them to attack'

Perfect subjunctive
The perfect subjunctive is formed by adding  to the perfect participle. One of the main uses is in sentences referring to an event or state in the past about which there is an element of doubt:
  'I think he may have gone'
  'he must have made a mistake'
  'I hope I'm not too late'
  'I'm afraid he may have gone'

It is also used for wishes:
  'if only he were gone'

The negative is made with na-:  'that I have not done'.

Imperative
The imperative (command) is similar to the subjunctive, except that the 2nd person singular has no ending:
   'write!'
   'write!' (plural or formal)

The negative lacks the prefix be-:  'do not write!'.

If the present stem ends in -av, as in  'go', this changes in the imperative singular to -o:
   'go!'

The imperative of the verb بودن 'to be' does not use the 'be-' prefix:
   'be!'
   'be!' (plural or formal)

The imperative of the verb  'to have' generally uses the perfect subjunctive form:
   'have!'

Optative
Although it mostly appears in classical Persian literature, the optative mood is sometimes used in common Persian. It is formed by adding -ād to the present stem: 
   'to do' → Present Stem  - →   ('may s/he do it!').  To negate it a prefix ma- is added:   ('may s/he not do that! we wish it will never happen') (=   in Modern Persian).

Although in general, this inflection has been abandoned, yet remnants of its usage can be observed in colloquial expressions such as  'come what may' and  lit. 'may that hand not spill [what it is holding]', meaning 'well done'.

Passive voice
Transitive verbs in Persian can be made passive by adding different tenses of the verb  'to become' to the perfect participle, e.g.
 'the letter has (not) been written'
 'the letter will be written'

In the subjunctive, the prefix be- is usually omitted:
 'the letter must be written'

For example, from  'to print' is made:
 'the letter was printed yesterday'

Intransitive, Transitive and Causative 
Like English verbs, Persian verbs are either transitive (requiring an object) or intransitive. In Persian an accusative marker (enclitic), comes after any definite direct object:
 Intransitive:   = 'I ran'. 
 Transitive:   = 'I saw him'

An intransitive verb can be turned into a transitive one by making it into a causative verb. This is done by adding -ān- (in the past tense -ānd-) to the present stem of the verb. For example:
 Intransitive verb:   (present stem: خواب xāb-) 'to sleep' →   = 'I slept'. 
 Causative form:   'to cause to sleep' →   = 'I caused him to sleep' ≈ 'I put him to bed'.
 
There are also cases where a causative verb is formed from a transitive verb:
 Transitive verb   (خور xor-) (to eat) → Causative:   ('to make eat') ≈ 'to feed'.

Causative verbs are not comprehensively productive, but are applied to certain verbs only.

Colloquial pronunciation
In colloquial Persian, many of the most commonly used verbs are pronounced in an abbreviated form; and ān and ām may become un and um. Here are some examples:
 > e 'he is'
 > midam 'I give'
 > miram 'I go'
 > mixunam 'I read'
 > miyām 'I come'
 > umadam 'I came'
 > mišam 'I become'
 > miše 'he becomes'
 > mitunam 'I can'
 > mige 'he says'

Compound verbs
Many verbs nowadays are compound verbs and many old simple verbs have been replaced by a compound. One of the most frequent verbs (known as light verbs) used to form compound verbs is   'to do, to make'.  For example, the word   (originally from Arabic) means 'conversation', while   means 'to speak'. Only the light verb (e.g.  ) is conjugated; the word preceding it is not affected. For example:                                                                                                     
   'I speak' or 'I am speaking' (as in the ability to speak a language)
   'I am speaking'
   'I have spoken'
   'I will speak'

Some other light verbs used to form compound verbs are: 
   ('to give') as in  'to happen'
   ('to take') as in  'to learn'
   ('to hit') as in  'to talk, to speak'
   ('to eat') as in  'to fall down'
   ('to become') as in  'to calm down'
   ('to have') as in  'to love'

   'to think'
   'to forget'
   'to cry'
   'to repair'

Auxiliary Verbs
The following auxiliary verbs are used in Persian:
   - 'must': Not conjugated. Followed by a subjunctive.
   - 'might': Not conjugated. Followed by a subjunctive.
   - 'can': Conjugated. Followed by a subjunctive.
   - 'want': Conjugated. Followed by a subjunctive.
   - 'I will': Conjugated in the present simple tense. Followed by the short infinitive.

Tenses in indirect speech
In indirect sentences introduced by a past-tense verb (e.g. 'he said that...', 'he asked whether...', 'it was obvious that...'), if the second verb refers to a situation simultaneous with, or an event shortly to follow, the main verb, the present tense is used in Persian. It does not change to a past tense as in English:
 'he said (that) he was a communist'

If the second verb refers to a time earlier than the first verb, it is common to use one of the perfect tenses for the second verb:
 'it became obvious that my guess had been correct and that the Director of Education had said...'

However the pluperfect can be used if the fact is certain:
 'I realised that he had been to Germany'

If the second verb merely represents an idea rather than a statement of fact, or a wish or a possibility, the subjunctive is used:
 'it's a pity that there's no snow'
 'I hope they come soon'

References

Bibliography
Boyle, John Andrew (1966). Grammar of Modern Persian. Harrassowitz, Wiesbaden.
Comrie, Bernard (1976). Aspect. Cambridge University Press.
Estaji, Azam; Bubenik, Vit (2007). "On the development of the tense/aspect system in Early New and New Persian". Diachronica 24, 1.
Fallahi, Mohammad M. (1992). "Present Perfect Simple and Progressive Tenses in English and Persian: A Contrastive Analysis of Linguistic Systems" In The Third International Symposium on Language and Linguistics, Bangkok, Thailand, 747-755. Chulalongkorn University.
Fallahi, Mohammad M. (1999). "Future tense systems in English and Persian: A Research in applied contrastive linguistics". Poznań Studies in Contemporary Linguistics 35, pp. 55–71.
Johanson, Lars; Utas, Bo (eds) (2000). Evidentials: Turkic, Iranian, and Neighbouring Languages. Mouton de Gruyter.
Khomeijani Farahani, Ali Akbar (1990). "A Syntactic and Semantic Study of the Tense and Aspect System of Modern Persian". PhD Thesis, University of Leeds.
Lambton, Ann K.S. (1953). Persian Grammar. Cambridge University Press.
Lazard, Gilbert (1985). "L'inférentiel ou passé distancié en persan", Studia Iranica 14/1, 27-42.
Mace, John (2003). Persian Grammar: For Reference and Revision
Rafiee, Abdi (1975). Colloquial Persian. Routledge.
Simeonova, Vesela; Zareikar, Gita (2015). "The Syntax of Evidentials in Azeri, Bulgarian, and Persian". Proceedings of the 2015 annual conference of the Canadian Linguistic Association.
Windfuhr, Gernot (1979). Persian Grammar: History and State of Its Study. De Gruyter.
Windfuhr, Gernot (1980). Modern Persian: Intermediate level 1. University of Michigan Press.
Yousef, Saeed; Torabi, Hayedeh (2012): Basic Persian: A Grammar and Workbook. Routledge.
Yousef, Saeed; Torabi, Hayedeh (2013): Intermediate Persian: A Grammar and Workbook. Routledge.

Persian language
Persian grammar
Indo-European verbs